Gao Jiamin (born June 26, 1966) is a retired professional wushu taolu athlete and taijiquan practitioner originally from China. She achieved an impressive competitive career throughout the 1990s and became known as the "Queen of Taiji". Gao has won 32 gold medals in a variety of competitions including the World Wushu Championships, Asian Games, East Asian Games, National Games of China, and in various other international and national competitions.

Career

Early career 
Gao began practicing wushu at the age of eight. In 1977, she was selected to train with the Fujian Wushu team and began to specialize in taijiquan under Zeng Nai Liang.

Competitive years: 1990-1997 
Gao's first major international appearance was at the 1990 Asian Games in Beijing, China, where she won the silver medal in women's taijiquan. A year later, she competed at the 1991 World Wushu Championships also held in Beijing, and became the first world champion in women's taijiquan. She then won a gold medal at the 1992 Asian Wushu Championships in Seoul, Korea. A year later, Gao won the women's taijiquan gold medal at the 1993 East Asian Games in Shanghai, China. Following this, she became a member of the sports committee of the 8th Chinese People's Political Consultative Conference from 1993 to 1998.

At the 1994 Asian Games in Hiroshima, Japan, Gao won the gold medal in women's taijiquan. A year later, Gao competed in the 1998 Asian Games in Bangkok, Thailand, and won once again in women's taijiquan. As of the 2018 Asian Games, she is the most prolific wushu athlete at the Asian Games, having won three medals with two of them being gold. In 1999, she announced her retirement from competition.

Post-retirement 
After her competitive career, Gao became a deputy of Fujian Province in the 9th National People's Congress. She also became the Vice President of the Fujian Wushu Team and an advisor of the Macau Wushu Team. In 2000, she and her husband, Yu Shaowen, moved to the United States and settled in Portland, Oregon. They currently teach at the U.S. Wushu Center. Today, Gao is also a coach of the USAWKF National Traditional Wushu Team and the National Taijiquan Team.

Awards 
By the Chinese Wushu Association

  (1995)

See also 

 List of Asian Games medalists in wushu

References

External links 
 Demonstration by Gao Jiamin of the 24-form Taijiquan

1966 births
Living people
Sportspeople from Fuzhou
Chinese wushu practitioners
Chinese tai chi practitioners
Sportspeople from Fujian
Chinese expatriates in the United States
Asian Games silver medalists for China
Asian Games gold medalists for China
Wushu practitioners at the 1990 Asian Games
Wushu practitioners at the 1994 Asian Games
Wushu practitioners at the 1998 Asian Games
Medalists at the 1990 Asian Games
Medalists at the 1994 Asian Games
Medalists at the 1998 Asian Games
Asian Games medalists in wushu